Dupontia proletaria is an extinct species of small air-breathing land snail, terrestrial pulmonate gastropod mollusk in the family Euconulidae, the hive snails.

This species is endemic to Mauritius and Réunion.

References

Dupontia (gastropod)
Extinct gastropods
Gastropods described in 1860
Taxonomy articles created by Polbot